Glory, Glamour and Gold was Army of Lovers fourth and last studio album of new songs, and was released in 1994. The following albums were compilations, each containing a few new songs. Three singles were released from this album: Lit de Parade, Sexual Revolution, and Life is Fantastic. The most successful single was Lit De Parade, which received a great deal of airplay in Europe.

For the first time, the group released all of the album's singles as remixes.

Hurrah Hurrah Apocalypse and Lit de Parade were produced by Vacuum, aka Alexander Bard and Anders Wollbeck.

Critical reception
Pan-European magazine Music & Media wrote, "Ancien regime campiness isn't dead, mesdames et messieurs. Over the top as always, this time the Sexual Revolution is proclaimed by the extravagant quartet. "Stand together black and white. Sleep united, hold on tight tonight." The music itself doesn't match their bizarre looks anymore. Only time will tell if it will earn or cost them airplay. With most tracks it could go either way, but the reggae tune Mr Battyman is a sure winner."

Track listing

Chart positions

Credits
Choir [The Army Tabernacle Choir] – The 69 Caruso, Erika Essen-Möller, Lilling Palmeklint, Lotten Andersson, Malin Bäckström, Rickard Evenlind 
Vocals, Bass – Dominika Peczynski 
Vocals, Drums – Jean-Pierre Barda 
Vocals, Guitar – Alexander Bard 
Vocals, Keyboards – Michaela Dornonville de la Cour

References

1994 albums
Army of Lovers albums
Stockholm Records albums